Johann Philipp von Greifenclau zu Vollraths (also spelled Greiffenklau and Vollrads) (1652–1719) was the Prince-Bishop of Würzburg from 1699 to 1719.

Johann Philipp von Greifenclau zu Vollraths was born in Amorbach on 13 February 1652, the son of Georg Philipp Freiherr von Greiffenclau-Vollrads, Amtmann of the Archbishopric of Mainz, and his wife Rosina von Oberstein.

He became a canon (Domizellar) of Würzburg Cathedral in 1666.  In 1676, he received the minor orders and then became a subdeacon. He became a member of the cathedral chapter of Würzburg Cathedral, at which point he became the cathedral's cantor. He was ordained as a priest on 13 April 1687. He became dean of Mainz Cathedral in 1695.

On February 9, 1699, the cathedral chapter of Würzburg Cathedral elected him to be the Prince-Bishop of Würzburg, with Pope Innocent XII confirming his appointment on 1 June 1699. He was subsequently consecrated as a bishop by Stephan Weinberger, auxiliary bishop of Würzburg, on 5 July 1699.

He died in Würzburg on 3 August 1719.

References

1652 births
1719 deaths
Prince-Bishops of Würzburg